The following outline is provided as an overview of and topical guide to the life and legacy of William Shakespeare, an English poet, playwright, and actor who lived during the 17th century. He is widely regarded as the greatest writer in the English language and the world's pre-eminent dramatist. He is often called England's national poet and the "Bard of Avon".

Works 
 Shakespeare bibliography
 Chronology of Shakespeare's plays
 William Shakespeare's collaborations
 Complete Works of Shakespeare
 Early texts of Shakespeare's works
 Shakespeare's late romances
 Shakespeare plays in quarto
 Shakespearean problem play
 Translations of works by William Shakespeare
 Shakespearean characters
 List of Shakespearean characters (A–K)
 List of Shakespearean characters (L–Z)
 List of historical figures dramatised by Shakespeare
 Women in Shakespeare's works

Plays

Tragedies 

 Antony and Cleopatra
 Coriolanus
 Hamlet
 Julius Caesar
 King Lear
 Macbeth
 Othello
 Romeo and Juliet
 Timon of Athens
 Titus Andronicus
 Troilus and Cressida

Comedies 

 All's Well That Ends Well
 As You Like It
 The Comedy of Errors
 Cymbeline
 Love's Labour's Lost
 Measure for Measure
 The Merchant of Venice
 The Merry Wives of Windsor
 A Midsummer Night's Dream
 Much Ado About Nothing
 Pericles, Prince of Tyre
 The Taming of the Shrew
 The Tempest
 Twelfth Night
 The Two Gentlemen of Verona
 The Two Noble Kinsmen
 The Winter's Tale

Histories 

 The Life and Death of King John
 Edward III (play)
 Richard II (play)
 Henry IV, Part 1
 Henry IV, Part 2
 Henry V (play)
 Henry VI, Part 1
 Henry VI, Part 2
 Henry VI, Part 3
 Richard III (play)
 Henry VIII (play)

Poetry 
 Shakespeare's sonnets – 1 • 2 • 3 • 4 • 5 • 6 • 7 • 8 • 9 • 10 • 11 • 12 • 13 • 14 • 15 • 16 • 17 • 18 • 19 • 20 • 21 • 22 • 23 • 24 • 25 • 26 • 27 • 28 • 29 • 30 • 31 • 32 • 33 • 34 • 35 • 36 • 37 • 38 • 39 • 40 • 41 • 42 • 43 • 44 • 45 • 46 • 47 • 48 • 49 • 50 • 51 • 52 • 53 • 54 • 55 • 56 • 57 • 58 • 59 • 60 • 61 • 62 • 63 • 64 • 65 • 66 • 67 • 68 • 69 • 70 • 71 • 72 • 73 • 74 • 75 • 76 • 77 • 78 • 79 • 80 • 81 • 82 • 83 • 84 • 85 • 86 • 87 • 88 • 89 • 90 • 91 • 92 • 93 • 94 • 95 • 96 • 97 • 98 • 99 • 100 • 101 • 102 • 103 • 104 • 105 • 106 • 107 • 108 • 109 • 110 • 111 • 112 • 113 • 114 • 115 • 116 • 117 • 118 • 119 • 120 • 121 • 122 • 123 • 124 • 125 • 126 • 127 • 128 • 129 • 130 • 131 • 132 • 133 • 134 • 135 • 136 • 137 • 138 • 139 • 140 • 141 • 142 • 143 • 144 • 145 • 146 • 147 • 148 • 149 • 150 • 151 • 152 • 153 • 154
 A Lover's Complaint
 Venus and Adonis
 The Rape of Lucrece
 The Phoenix and the Turtle
 The Passionate Pilgrim

Apocrypha

Plays 
 Sir Thomas More
 The History of Cardenio (lost)
 Love's Labour's Won (lost)
 The Birth of Merlin
 Locrine
 The London Prodigal
 The Puritan
 The Second Maiden's Tragedy
 Double Falsehood
 Thomas of Woodstock
 Sir John Oldcastle
 Thomas Lord Cromwell
 A Yorkshire Tragedy
 Fair Em
 Mucedorus
 The Merry Devil of Edmonton
 Arden of Faversham
 Edmund Ironside
 Vortigern and Rowena
 Ireland Shakespeare forgeries

Poetry 
 To the Queen
 A Funeral Elegy

Analyses 
 Shakespeare's editors
 Shakespeare attribution studies
 Shakespeare authorship question
 Shakespeare's writing style

Life 

 Anne Hathaway (wife of Shakespeare)
 Shakespeare's Birthplace
 Shakespeare garden
 Shakespeare's Globe
 Shakespeare's handwriting
 Shakespeare in performance
 Portraits of Shakespeare
 Religious views of William Shakespeare
 Shakespeare's reputation
 Sexuality of William Shakespeare
 Spelling of Shakespeare's name
 Stratford-upon-Avon
 Shakespeare's will

Associated people 
 Robert Armin
 Matteo Bandello
 Cuthbert Burbage
 Richard Burbage
 Robert Chester (poet)
 Henry Condell
 The Dark Lady
 Leonard Digges (writer)
 Fair Youth
 Richard Field (printer)
 John Fletcher (playwright)
 Archibald Dennis Flower
 Samuel Gilburne
 John Heminges
 Ben Jonson
 William Kempe
 Edward Knight (King's Men)
 Emilia Lanier
 John Manningham
 Mr W.H.
 Augustine Phillips
 Rival Poet
 John Robinson (17th century)
 Henry Wriothesley, 3rd Earl of Southampton
 Nahum Tate
 Anne Whateley
 George Wilkins
 Henry Willobie

Legacy 
Shakespeare's influence – in addition to his works, Shakespeare's legacy includes the ongoing performance of his plays, and his influence upon culture and the arts, extending from theatre and literature to present-day movies and the English language itself.
 :Category:Adaptations of works by William Shakespeare
 List of titles of works based on Shakespearean phrases
 Cultural references to Hamlet
 Cultural references to Ophelia
 Cultural references to Othello

Memorials and monuments 
 Memorials to William Shakespeare
 Shakespeare's funerary monument
 Statue of William Shakespeare, Leicester Square
 Shakespeare's Way

Shakespearean phrases 
 Phrases from Hamlet in common English
 "All that glitters is not gold"
 "All the world's a stage"
 "All's Well That Ends Well"
 "Band of brothers"
 "Beast with two backs"
 "Between you and I"
 "Brave new world"
 "By the pricking of my thumbs"
 "The dogs of war"
 "Et tu, Brute?"
 "Even a worm will turn"
 "Friends, Romans, countrymen, lend me your ears"
 "Hoist with his own petard"
 "Honorificabilitudinitatibus"
 "Ides of March"
 "The lady doth protest too much, methinks"
 "Let's kill all the lawyers"
 "Mortal coil"
 "Much Ado About Nothing"
 "Once more unto the breach"
 "The quality of mercy"
 "A rose by any other name would smell as sweet"
 "Salad days"
 "Star-crossed"
 "There's the rub"
 "Thy name is"
 "To be, or not to be"
 "Tomorrow and tomorrow and tomorrow"
 "What a piece of work is a man"
 "What's past is prologue"
 "Winter of Discontent"

Shakespearean theatre 
 Shakespeare festivals
 Shakespeare in the Park festivals
 List of William Shakespeare screen adaptations
 BBC Television Shakespeare
 Shakespeare: The Animated Tales
 ShakespeaRe-Told
 Shakespearean theatres
 Shakespeare's Globe Centres
 :Category:Shakespearean theatre companies
 Shakespeare Theatre Association

Works about Shakespeare 
 Asimov's Guide to Shakespeare
 Complete Works
 Timeline of Shakespeare criticism
 The Herbal Bed
 Lear, Tolstoy and the Fool
 Nothing Like the Sun: A Story of Shakespeare's Love Life
 The Quest for Shakespeare
 Shakespeare
 Shakespeare's Kings
 Shakespeare's Politics
 Shakespeare: The World as Stage
 William Shakespeare

Fictional works about Shakespeare 
 Shakespeare in Love
 Upstart Crow

See also 
 Outline of literature
 Outline of poetry
 Outline of theatre

External links 

 Internet Shakespeare Editions, University of Victoria, British Columbia, Canada
 "All Shakespeare's works", Folger Shakespeare Library
 Open Source Shakespeare complete works, with search engine and concordance
 First Four Folios  at Miami University Library, digital collection
 The Shakespeare Quartos Archive
 Shakespeare's sonnets, poems, and texts at Poets.org
 Shakespeare's Words the online version of the best-selling glossary and language companion
 Shakespeare and Music
 Shakespeare's Will from The National Archives
 
 The Shakespeare Birthplace Trust
 
 
 
 
 Discovering Literature: Shakespeare at the British Library

William Shakespeare
Shakespeare, William
Shakespeare, William